"Car Thief" is the 11th track on the album Paul's Boutique by American hip hop group the Beastie Boys, released on July 25, 1989. It heavily samples "Rien Ne Va Plus" by Funk Factory, and was itself sampled in Faith No More's 1992 song "Midlife Crisis."

Samples
 "I'll Bet You" by The Jackson 5
 "Hurdy Gurdy Man" by Donovan
 "Woodstock" (Max Yasgur speech)
 "Drop the Bomb" by Trouble Funk
 "Rien Ne Va Plus" by Funk Factory

Lyrical references

 Russell Simmons
 Rick Rubin
 David Bowie
 James Brown
 Space cake cookies
 Ricky Powell
 St. Anthony's Feast
 In the Belly of the Beast
 The Hurdy Gurdy Man
 Ecstasy
 Marijuana
 PCP

References

Beastie Boys songs
1989 songs
Songs written by Ad-Rock
Songs written by Mike D
Songs written by Adam Yauch
Song recordings produced by Dust Brothers
Songs written by John King (record producer)
Songs written by Michael Simpson (producer)